Nicola Bianchi from the University of Padova, Italy was named Fellow of the Institute of Electrical and Electronics Engineers (IEEE) in 2014 for contributions to the theory and practice of electric machine design and control.

References

External links

20th-century births
Living people
Fellow Members of the IEEE
Year of birth missing (living people)
Place of birth missing (living people)
Academic staff of the University of Padua